Holy Name High School (HNHS) is a private, Catholic, co-educational high school in Parma Heights, Ohio, US. It is a part of the Roman Catholic Diocese of Cleveland.

Holy Name is a member of the Great Lakes Conference with Fairview, Buckeye, Parma Senior, Normandy, Valley Forge, Elyria Catholic, Bay Village, and Rocky River High Schools.

History
Founded in 1914, Holy Name was the first Catholic high school in the Cleveland area to enroll both male and female students. The school was originally located on Harvard and Broadway in Cleveland, but in 1977 moved to Queens Highway in Parma Heights, Ohio, to accommodate its growing enrollment. The move included taking over the all-female Nazareth Academy, which was run by the Congregation of the Sisters of St. Joseph.

Motto
The school's present motto was adopted in 1926, when "The School's The Thing" appeared in the yearbook. The article which accompanied the motto was purposeful in its insistence that personal glory in any field of school activity means very little.

Seal
The Chi Rho incorporates the first two letters of the name of Christ in Greek characters XP. The Holy Name High School seal consists of the Chi Rho encircled by the school of identification. This symbol now resides on the far wall of the new gym. The gift was donated by the Class of 2006.

Mascot
Holy Name's mascot, the Green Wave, originated in the early 1920s when it was first used to describe the perfect co-ordination of the Holy Name American football team, which gave the appearance of a giant green wave engulfing opponents. They are also commonly called the "Little Davids", in reference to David and Goliath, because of efforts in defeating larger schools, who were considered large favorites.

Charity game
On November 23, 1946, Holy Name High School competed in the annual Charity Game, the Cleveland high school championship game, at Cleveland Municipal Stadium against Cathedral Latin High School (now Notre Dame-Cathedral Latin). The attendance at the game was a local record crowd of 70,955. It is the second-largest attendance for an American high school football game in history. Holy Name was defeated by Cathedral Latin, 35–6.

In 1961 Frank Solich led the Holy Name squad and defeated Cathedral Latin 12–7, to win the Charity Game. Solich ran for 184 yards and two scores in the game in front of 29,918.

Ohio High School Athletic Association State Championships
Football – 1975
Baseball – 1981
 Girls' Soccer – 2006

 Volleyball – 2018

Notable alumni
John Banaszak, former NFL player
Chris Broussard, sports journalist, contributor to ESPN, New York Times and TrueHoop. Currently works for Fox Sports.
Bob Ptacek, football player at University of Michigan and for Cleveland Browns, also an All-Star in Canadian Football League
Frank Solich, Ohio University head football coach and former head coach of University of Nebraska, leading it to 2001 national championship game; featured on a 1965 cover of Sports Illustrated
Ashley Sebera, fitness competitor, model, bodybuilder, and professional wrestler, competing under ring name Dana Brooke
Mark Termini, Hall of Fame basketball player at Holy Name (1974) and Case Western Reserve University (1978); noted sports attorney and NBA agent/contract negotiator

Notes and references

External links
Holy Name High School

High schools in Cuyahoga County, Ohio
Educational institutions established in 1914
Catholic secondary schools in Ohio
Roman Catholic Diocese of Cleveland
1914 establishments in Ohio